Henderson Pierre (born 1963), is a male former athlete who competed for England.

Athletics career
Pierre represented England in the high jump event, and won a bronze medal at the 1986 Commonwealth Games in Edinburgh, Scotland.

References

1964 births
Living people
Commonwealth Games medallists in athletics
Commonwealth Games bronze medallists for England
Athletes (track and field) at the 1986 Commonwealth Games
English male high jumpers
Medallists at the 1986 Commonwealth Games